The 1996 Men's Olympic Football Tournament, played as part of the 1996 Summer Olympics, was hosted in Birmingham, Alabama, Washington, D.C., Orlando, Florida, Miami, Florida and Athens, Georgia. From 1992 onwards, male competitors should be under 23 years old and starting from this tournament, a maximum of three over-23 players are allowed per squad. The tournament featured 16 national teams from the six continental confederations. The 16 teams were drawn into four groups of four and each group played a round-robin tournament. At the end of the group stage, the top two teams advanced to the knockout stage, beginning with the quarter-finals and culminating with the gold medal match at Sanford Stadium on August 3, 1996.

Competition schedule
The match schedule of the tournament.

Venues

Qualification
The following 16 teams qualified for the 1996 Olympic men's football tournament:

Match officials

Squads

Group stage

Group A

Group B

Group C

Group D

Knockout stage

Quarter-finals

Semi-finals

Bronze medal match

Gold medal match

Final ranking

Goalscorers
With six goals, Hernán Crespo of Argentina and Bebeto of Brazil are the top scorers of the tournament. In total, 90 goals were scored by 55 different players, with four of them credited as own goals.

6 goals
 Hernán Crespo
 Bebeto
5 goals
 Ronaldinho
4 goals
 Marco Branca
3 goals
 Flávio Conceição
 Florian Maurice
 Nwankwo Kanu
2 goals

 Ariel Ortega
 Claudio López
 Aurelio Vidmar
 Christian Saba
 Csaba Madar
 Masakiyo Maezono
 Celestine Babayaro
 Jay-Jay Okocha
 Afonso Martins
 Óscar García Junyent
 Raúl González
 Brian Maisonneuve

1 goal

 Diego Simeone
 Gustavo Adrián López
 Mark Viduka
 Peter Tsekenis
 Juninho Paulista
 Antoine Sibierski
 Robert Pires
 Sylvain Legwinski
 Augustine Ahinful
 Charles Akonnor
 Ebenezer Hagan
 Felix Aboagye
 Tamás Sándor
 Kenichi Uemura
 Teruyoshi Ito
 Francisco Palencia
 José Manuel Abundis
 Daniel Amokachi
 Emmanuel Amunike
 Victor Ikpeba
 Nuno Capucho
 Nuno Gomes
 José Calado
 Paulo Alves
 Fuad Anwar Amin
 Mohammed Al-Khilaiwi
 Lee Ki-hyung
 Yoon Jong-hwan
 Santi
 Mohamed Mkacher
 Claudio Reyna
 Jovan Kirovski

Own goals
 Roberto Carlos (playing against Nigeria)
 Afo Dodoo (playing against Brazil)
 Tadahiro Akiba (playing against Nigeria)
 Agustín Aranzábal (playing against Argentina)

References

External links

Olympic Football Tournaments Atlanta 1996 – Men, FIFA.com
RSSSF Summary
FIFA Technical Report (Part 1), (Part 2), (Part 3) and (Part 4)

Football at the 1996 Summer Olympics
1996 Summer Olympics events
Sports in Athens, Georgia
Men's events at the 1996 Summer Olympics